Bill Macdonald is an American professional sportscaster who is currently the TV play-by-play announcer for the Los Angeles Lakers of the National Basketball Association (NBA) on Spectrum SportsNet alongside color commentator Stu Lantz.

Career
Macdonald joined the network, then called Prime Ticket, at its inception in 1985. He has also worked for Fox Sports West/Prime Ticket
In the past, Macdonald has hosted the following pre-game and in-game shows:
Lakers Live, from Staples Center with analyst Norm Nixon 
Angels Live, from Angel Stadium with José Mota
Ducks Live, from Honda Center with Brian Hayward

Background
He is also the former host of the Los Angeles Kings' pregame show Break the Ice and calls play-by-play for Los Angeles Avengers Arena Football, UCLA college football and basketball for FSN Prime Ticket. He has also been the host of FSN's Pacific-10 Conference men's basketball tournament coverage at the Staples Center for the past several years.  For the past three years, Macdonald has hosted the UCLA Press Conference Show, with Matt Stevens in 2005 and 2006, and James Washington in 2007. 
Macdonald called the game (January 22, 2006) in which Kobe Bryant scored 81 points, the second-highest total in NBA history. He filled in for the play-by-play analyst at the time, Joel Meyers, who had another broadcasting commitment that day.  When Meyers left the Lakers at the end of the 2010-2011 season due to the team not renewing his contract, the Lakers hired Macdonald to replace him.  Macdonald has been the team's play-by-play voice full-time since the 2011-2012 season.

Macdonald has three twin sons, and resides in Newport Beach.

References

Living people
College football announcers
UCLA Bruins football announcers
American sports announcers
Arena football announcers
College basketball announcers in the United States
Television anchors from Los Angeles
University of Southern California alumni
Place of birth missing (living people)
Los Angeles Lakers announcers
Los Angeles Kings announcers
Anaheim Ducks announcers
Los Angeles Angels of Anaheim announcers
Major Indoor Soccer League (1978–1992) commentators
Year of birth missing (living people)